May Valley is a nearly flat snow-covered valley along the western flank of the Forrestal Range, at the juncture of Lexington Table and Saratoga Table, in the Pensacola Mountains of Antarctica. It was mapped from surveys and U.S. Navy air photos, 1956–66, and was named by the Advisory Committee on Antarctic Names for Walter H. May, an aerographer at Ellsworth Station, winter 1957.

References

Valleys of Queen Elizabeth Land